Henry Bridgeman may refer to:

 Henry Bridgeman (pirate) (1659–after 1696), English pirate
 Henry Bridgeman (bishop) (died 1682), Anglican clergyman, the bishop of Sodor and Man 
 Henry Bridgeman, 1st Baron Bradford (1725–1800), British MP for Ludlow & (Much) Wenlock
 Henry Bridgeman (British Army officer) (1882–1972), British soldier 
 Henry Simpson Bridgeman (1757–1782), British politician